Joe Holland (born Peter Joseph Holland in New York, also known as Tim Carson and sometimes credited as Tim Holland) (July 21, 1961 - May 4, 1994) was an actor, scriptwriter, and director. He was best known for playing Zed in the film Back to the Beach (1987) and for directing an award-winning short film, Delirious (winner of a Frank Capra Award and a Warner Communciations Award) and later a feature film, Amberwaves (1994), along with other film and television roles.

Early life 
The son of Hollywood celebrity and model Joanna Holland (later Joanna Carson) and businessman Tim Holland, he was also the stepson of Johnny Carson. He attended Wesleyan University where he won the Frank Capra Award and a Warner Communications Award for his student film, Delirious.

Career 
Holland appeared in films like Top Gun (1986), Back to the Beach (1987) and Down Twisted (1987).

In television, he appeared in episodes of Cheers (where he played a friend of Diane Chambers in the Season 5 episode "One Last Fling"), 21 Jump Street, Deadly Nightmares, Mork & Mindy, and Booker.

He also appeared in the music video for Lou Gramm's "Midnight Blue" (1987). Actress Traci Lind wrote about working on this music video with Holland, mentioning he was also known as "Tim Carson", and discussing how he died a few years later.

Not long before his death, he wrote, directed and starred in the film Amberwaves (1994), which starred Rae Dawn Chong and Lenny Von Dohlen, among others.

Personal life 
He died on May 4, 1994 in Los Angeles, California. He is interred at Forest Lawns Memorial Park.

External links

References 

1961 births
1994 deaths
20th-century American male actors
American male television actors
American directors